In computing, an address space defines a range of discrete addresses, each of which may correspond to a network host, peripheral device, disk sector, a memory cell or other logical or physical entity.

For software programs to save and retrieve stored data, each datum must have an address where it can be located. The number of address spaces available depends on the underlying address structure, which is usually limited by the computer architecture being used. Often an address space in a system with virtual memory corresponds to a highest level translation table, e.g., a segment table in IBM System/370.

Address spaces are created by combining enough uniquely identified qualifiers to make an address unambiguous within the address space. For a person's physical address, the address space would be a combination of locations, such as a neighborhood, town, city, or country. Some elements of a data address space may be the same, but if any element in the address is different, addresses in said space will reference different entities. For example, there could be multiple buildings at the same address of "32 Main Street" but in different towns, demonstrating that different towns have different, although similarly arranged, street address spaces.

An address space usually provides (or allows) a partitioning to several regions according to the mathematical structure it has. In the case of total order, as for memory addresses, these are simply chunks. Like the hierarchical design of postal addresses, some nested domain hierarchies appear as a directed ordered tree, such as with the Domain Name System or a directory structure. In the Internet, the Internet Assigned Numbers Authority (IANA) allocates ranges of IP addresses to various registries so each can manage their parts of the global Internet address space.

Examples
Uses of addresses include, but are not limited to the following:
 Memory addresses for main memory, memory-mapped I/O, as well as for virtual memory;
 Device addresses on an expansion bus;
 Sector addressing for disk drives;
 File names on a particular volume;
 Various kinds of network host addresses in computer networks;
 Uniform resource locators in the Internet.

Address mapping and translation 

Another common feature of address spaces are mappings and translations, often forming numerous layers. This usually means that some higher-level address must be translated to lower-level ones in some way. 
For example, a file system on a logical disk operates using linear sector numbers, which have to be translated to absolute LBA sector addresses, in simple cases, via addition of the partition's first sector address. Then, for a disk drive connected via Parallel ATA, each of them must be converted to logical cylinder-head-sector address due to the interface historical shortcomings. It is converted back to LBA by the disk controller, then, finally, to physical cylinder, head and sector numbers.

The Domain Name System maps its names to and from network-specific addresses (usually IP addresses), which in turn may be mapped to link layer network addresses via Address Resolution Protocol. Network address translation may also occur on the edge of different IP spaces, such as a local area network and the Internet.

An iconic example of virtual-to-physical address translation is virtual memory, where different pages of virtual address space map either to page file or to main memory physical address space. It is possible that several numerically different virtual addresses all refer to one physical address and hence to the same physical byte of RAM. It is also possible that a single virtual address maps to zero, one, or more than one physical address.

See also 
 Addressability
 Linear address space
 Name space
 Virtualization

References 

Computing terminology
Data management
Computer architecture